Om Parkash Yadav is a member of the Haryana Legislative Assembly from the BJP representing the Narnaul Vidhan sabha Constituency in Haryana. He won 2019 Haryana Legislative Assembly election from BJP seat of Narnaul.

References 

People from Mahendragarh district
Bharatiya Janata Party politicians from Haryana
Living people
Haryana MLAs 2014–2019
Year of birth missing (living people)